Nowness (stylized NOWNESS) is a digital video channel that was launched in 2010 by its founder Jefferson Hack as a brand of LVMH Moët Hennessy Louis Vuitton SE. In May 2017, Modern Dazed, a new joint venture between Chinese publisher Modern Media and the UK's Dazed Media, acquired a majority stake in Nowness.

History
Nowness launched in 2010. Its founder and chief creative executive is Jefferson Hack .

Awards
 2010 CLIO Award for Best Interactive Website
 2011 Webby Award: Best Fashion Website
 2011 WWD Japan Fashion Web Grand Prix Award
 2013 Lovie Award: Best Interactive Video (Ballroom Battle)
 2013 Lovie Award for Best Lifestyle Website
 2014 Berlin Fashion Film Festival: Best Visual Effects (for shoppable fashion short, "Mine All Mine")
 2014 Webby Award: Best Cultural Website
 2017 Webby Award: Best Cultural Website

References

External links

"Digital Scorecard: NOWNESS" BoF Team, Business of Fashion (February 24, 2010)
"Marketing to the Millennials" Menkes, Suzy. The New York Times (March 2, 2010)
"7 Stellar Examples of Branded Content from the Fashion Industry" Wright Lee, Macala. Mashable (January 3, 2011)
"The 30 Most Underrated Innovations of 2010" Wong, Danny. The Huffington Post (January 18, 2011)
"Social Media Breeds Edvertorial" Strugatz, Rachel. WWD (January 20, 2011)
"Fashion's Power 25: The people and platforms that truly matter in the world of style" Bazilian, Emma. Adweek (September 12, 2011)

LVMH
Lifestyle websites
Internet properties established in 2010
2010 establishments in New York (state)